Johannes Petrus "Jannie" Claassens (born 30 June 1969) is a South African former rugby union player.

Playing career
As a schoolboy Claassens represented  at the 1988 Craven Week tournament. During 1992, Claassens was selected for the World XV that tour New Zealand to mark the centenary of the New Zealand Rugby Union.

In 1994 he toured with the Springboks to New Zealand and to Britain and Ireland. Claassens did not play in any test matches but played in eight tour matches, scoring three tries for the Springboks. In 1993 and in 1996, he represented South Africa in sevens.

Accolades
Claassens was voted as one of the five South Africa Young Players of the Year for 1990, along with Andrew Aitken, Bernard Fourie, Ian MacDonald and Theo van Rensburg.

See also
List of South Africa national rugby union players – Springbok no. 611
List of South Africa national rugby sevens players

References

1969 births
Living people
South African rugby union players
South Africa international rugby union players
Blue Bulls players
South Africa international rugby sevens players
Rugby union players from Welkom
Rugby union centres